Bandanow (also Romanized as Bandānow) is a village in Jam Rural District, in the Central District of Jam County, Bushehr Province, Iran. At the 2006 census, its population was 135, in 34 families.

References 

Populated places in Jam County